Leonid Yakovlevich Mezheritski (Pronunciation: [leoˈnid ˈyakovlevich meʒeˈrit͡skij], 11 December 1930 - 12 November 2007), was a Ukrainian and Russian (Soviet) artist, still-life, portrait and landscape painter.

Biography 
Leonid Mezheritski was born on December 11, 1930, and spent most of his life in the cosmopolitan city of Odessa, whose streets and suburbs are found in many of his works. He often undertook creative trips to Ukraine and Russia. After the fall of the Iron Curtain, also to Italy, Germany and Israel, where in the north of the country, in Upper Galilee, he lived and worked for the last eight years of his life.

He graduated from Odessa State Art School in 1955, class of Dina Frumina and worked mainly in the medium of oil, in his own picturesque manner, based on the coloristic nature of Impressionism and Post-Impressionism. Some experts distinguish this artist first and foremost for his special gift of portrait painting. However, the major part of his paintings belongs to the genre of plein air (marine, urban and village) landscape which was a traditional genre of the South Russian School (Odessa School) of Painting.

His love for this genre remained with him throughout his creative career. He painted gulfs of the Black Sea and Mediterranean Sea, Russian snowy winters and small Ukrainian villages with blossoming apricot and sour cherry trees, mounts in Tuscany and hills in Israel, cityscapes in Berlin, Tel Aviv and, of course, his most favorite nooks of Odessa.

The genre of still life was also what attracted the artist; here are his paintings characterized by vital coloristic compositions with as well as laconically expressive objects.

The number of his paintings in the portraiture and still life genres is approximately equal. The Israeli period includes a large series of landscapes, a few still-lives and portraits.

He took part in several large exhibitions, including some all-USSR and republic (Russia, Ukraine) displays. From 1970, as a matter of principle, he refused, with rare exceptions, to participate in official exhibitions. He held two solo exhibitions: 1997 in Odessa at the Jewish Cultural Center  and 2002 in Berlin (Germany) at the Russian Center of Science and Culture. Several landscape works in 1973 were purchased by one of the world's largest private art galleries of twentieth-century art, Gekkoso (Japan), and exhibited as part of international exhibitions of Soviet art.

Creative works of the artist are represented in the collections of public art museums in Ukraine, in private collections in Ukraine, USA, Canada, Germany, the UK, Israel and Russia. The narrative-thematic paintings, created in the 1960s – 1970s on the orders of the Soviet Art Fund in realistic style can be found in current directories of galleries across Ukraine and Russia.

A master of coloristic painting, Leonid Mezheritski died on November 12, 2007 in Berlin and is buried in Berlin, at the Jewish Cemetery in Weissensee.

References

Sources 
 Artist's Favourites by Adrian Piper  . Spike Art magazine, No. 31 / Spring 2012, Vienna, ISSN 1813-6281 
 Lev Mezhberg. "Few Grateful Words about Odessa Artists". New York, 1985. In:“The Modern Russian Poetry Anthology “By a Blue Lagoon”. (in Russian).
 Vitali Bessmertny. “Travelling Sketching of Leonid Mezheritski”. “Odesski vestnik”. Odessa, № 239 of 11 December 1996 (in Russian).
 Raisa Bourlina. “An Inspiration is Not for Sale...”. “Novosti Karmielya”. Karmiel, № 320 of 17 February 2000 (in Russian).
 Dina Frumina. “My Memories”. Edition: “Galereya “Most”, Odessa. 2005 (in Russian).
 Bella Kerdman. “Keep on Painting, it Will Pass to Your Account...”. “Vesti”. Tel Aviv, № 36 of 27 April 2006 (in Russian).
 Tamara Litvinenko. "To the Memory of the Artist and Friend”. "Tikva" – “Or sameakh”. Odessa, № 2 of 9 January 2008 (in Russian).

External links 
 Leonid Mezheritski homepage/extended biography, virtual museum (English, German and Russian)

Impressionist painters
Cityscape artists
Soviet artists
Ukrainian artists
Russian painters
Russian marine artists
Russian portrait painters
Russian still life painters
Russian landscape painters
20th-century Russian painters
Russian male painters
Israeli painters
Israeli portrait painters
1930 births
2007 deaths
20th-century Russian male artists